Meganola strigula, the small black arches, is a moth of the family Nolidae. The species was first described by Michael Denis and Ignaz Schiffermüller in 1775. It is found in Europe, Russia and Asia Minor.

The wingspan is 18–24 mm. Adults are on wing from June to July and can be attracted to light.

The larvae feed on Quercus (including Quercus robur), Fagus, Prunus and Tilia
species.

Its habitat includes mature deciduous woodland, where the larvae are believed to feed on oak (Quercus).

External links

Lepiforum e.V.

Nolinae
Moths of Europe
Moths described in 1775